Joel Tammeka (born 11 February 1951) is a retired rally driver from Estonia. Tammeka is one of the few racing drivers in the Baltic states who has achieved good results competing in Dakar rally. In 1991 Dakar rally he became third in the truck class driving with Kamaz. Tammeka still holds the record for the best overall result in a truck class in the Baltics as well as for an Estonian driver.

Tammeka was part of the Soviet Union team from 1989 to 1991 and was driving for the Kamaz team in 1991 Paris-Dakar Rally. At the 1991 Dakar rally, while he was holding second place, he was given orders from the Kamaz team to let Russian Goltsov crew ahead and finished behind them in third place.

Achievements
 1982 - USSR Rally Championship: 1st place.
 1983 - Rally Finland: 1st place in B10 class.
 1984 - USSR Rally Championship: 3rd place.
 1991 - Dakar Rally: 3rd place in trucks class.

Racing record

WRC results

Dakar results

References

External links
 https://ralli.ee/kas-sa-teadsid-kes-on-joel-tammeka-kurvilise-tee-legendid/
 https://epl.delfi.ee/artikkel/51026889/dakari-ralli-eestlaste-pilgu-labi-votab-soitjalt-koik-ja-rohkemgi
 https://uus.autosport.ee/uudised/varske-powerstage-joel-tammekaga-dakari-rallist-ja-paljust-muust/

1951 births
Living people
Estonian rally drivers
Estonian rally co-drivers
Dakar Rally drivers
Sportspeople from Tallinn